Salix serpillifolia or Salix serpyllifolia is a species of flowering plant in the family Salicaceae.

Description
This plant develop woody, dark brown, longitudinally striated, creeping stems. The leaves are tiny, simple, subsessile, spathulate to obovate, without stipules. The upper side is glabrous, glossy dark green covered with a thin waxy layer. Like all willows this species is dioecious. Catkins appear after the leaves. They are about 5 mm long, with yellow anthers. Flowers bloom from May to August.

Distribution
It is present in mountains of southern Europe, from the Iberian Peninsula, the Alps and the Balkans.

Habitat

Uses
Salix serpillifolia contains salicin, the source of salicylic acid in aspirin.

References
Pignatti S. - Flora d'Italia (3 vol.) - Edagricole – 1982

External links
Biolib
Alpine Plant Encyclopaedia
Acta Plantarum

serpillifolia
Plants described in 1772
Taxa named by Giovanni Antonio Scopoli